Parliamentary elections are scheduled to be held in Libya. According to the High National Elections Commission (HNEC), 5,385 candidates registered for the parliamentary election by the 7 December 2021 deadline.

On 22 February 2022 Abdul Hamid Dbeibeh, the prime minister of the Government of National Unity, announced a plan in which elections would be held in June. He later proposed holding the elections at the end of 2022, although it was later pushed back again.

References

Elections in Libya
Libya